Saint Croix Falls may refer to:

Saint Croix Falls, Wisconsin, a city in Polk County, Wisconsin, United States. 
The falls at Saint Croix Falls Dam